Hylarana macrodactyla is a species of frog in the family Ranidae. It is also known as the Guangdong frog, three-striped grass frog and the marbled slender frog.

It is found in Cambodia, China, Hong Kong, Laos, Malaysia, Myanmar, Thailand, and Vietnam. Its natural habitats are subtropical or tropical dry forests, subtropical or tropical moist lowland forests, subtropical or tropical moist montane forests, subtropical or tropical seasonally wet or flooded lowland grassland, rivers, swamps, freshwater lakes, rural gardens, heavily degraded former forest, ponds, and irrigated land. It is threatened by habitat loss, depending on the wetland to sustain their populations during the adverse conditions in dry season.

Photos

References

Sources
Che, Pang, Zhao, Wu, Zhao, and Zhang, 2007, Mol. Phylogenet. Evol., 43: 3,
Frank and Ramus, 1995, Compl. Guide Scient. Common Names Amph. Rept. World: 108

External links
Amphibian and Reptiles of Peninsular Malaysia - Hylarana macrodactyla

macrodactyla
Amphibians of Myanmar
Amphibians of Cambodia
Amphibians of China
Fauna of Hong Kong
Amphibians of Laos
Amphibians of Malaysia
Amphibians of Thailand
Amphibians of Vietnam
Amphibians described in 1858